Paleosuchus is a South American genus of reptiles in the subfamily Caimaninae of the family Alligatoridae. They are the smallest members of the order Crocodilia in the Americas.
The genus contains two extant species and a yet unnamed fossil species.

References

External links

Alligatoridae
Reptile genera
Taxa named by John Edward Gray
Taxonomy articles created by Polbot